Gsell is a surname shared by:

Alex Gsell, musician, former member of German band XPQ-21
Brad K. Gsell, President of the International Council of Christian Churches and of The Independent Board for Presbyterian Foreign Missions
Dorothea Maria Gsell née Graff (1678–1743), German painter
Émile Gsell (1838–1879), French photographer
Francis Xavier Gsell OBE (1872–1960), Australian Roman Catholic bishop
Georg Gsell (1673–1740), Swiss Baroque painter
Guy Gsell, member of the American children's theatre troupe Paper Bag Players
Katharina Gsell (1707–1773), wife of Leonhard Euler, mother of Johann Euler, and  daughter of Georg Gsell
Lucien Laurent-Gsell (died 1944), French illustrator
Maria Gsell, American high school teacher
 (1870–1947), French writer and critic of French art
René Gsell (1921–2000), French linguist
Stéphane Gsell (1864–1932), French historian
Tatjana Gsell, reality TV personality
Wieland Gsell, mayor of Zellingen, Germany

German-language surnames